Asharkota or Asharkata is a village in Ramganj Upazila, Lakshmipur District in the Chittagong Division of eastern Bangladesh. It lies just to the northwest of Palakhal and north of Singua,  by road north of Ramganj.

Landmarks
There are several mosques in the village including Asharkota Prodhania bari Mosque and Asharkota Munshi Meher Ullah Jame Mosjid. Taguria Primary School and Taguria Obaidul Haque High School lie to the northeast in Taguria.

References

Populated places in Lakshmipur District